Oleg Ivanovich Kovalyov  (7 September 1948 – 11 May 2020) was a Russian politician who served as governor of Ryazan Oblast (2008–2017).

He was a member of the State Duma of the Federal Assembly of the third, fourth and fifth convocations (1999–2008), Honored Builder of the Russian Federation (1997).

Awards and honorary titles 
 Order For Merit to the Fatherland  3rd class (2008)
  Order For Merit to the Fatherland 4th class (2005)
   Order of Honour  (2013)
 Order of Friendship (2002)
   Medal  In Commemoration of the 850th Anniversary of Moscow  (1997)

References

External links
 Будем выстраивать Россию как надежный и удобный дом — Олег Ковалев Интервью на сайте ИТАР-ТАСС

1948 births
2020 deaths
Governors of Ryazan Oblast
United Russia politicians
Recipients of the Order "For Merit to the Fatherland", 3rd class
Recipients of the Order of Honour (Russia)
20th-century Russian politicians
21st-century Russian politicians
Third convocation members of the State Duma (Russian Federation)
Fourth convocation members of the State Duma (Russian Federation)
Fifth convocation members of the State Duma (Russian Federation)
Members of the Federation Council of Russia (after 2000)
Deaths from the COVID-19 pandemic in Russia